The Pocket Dream is a play by Elly Brewer and Sandi Toksvig, published in English circa 1992. A production of the play was put on at the Nottingham Playhouse, Albery Theatre in London in 1991-2 and starred Clive Mantle. In 2004 it was performed in theatres such as the Theatre Royal, York.

References

1991 plays
British plays